The Oltenia Philharmonic Orchestra is an orchestra in Craiova, Romania. It has been founded in 1904 and established in 1947 by a royal decree. The present activity is carried out by the Symphony Orchestra, the Chamber Orchestra, the Academic Choir and several chamber assemblies.

References

External links
Official website

Romanian orchestras
Musical groups established in 1904